Dolzago is a comune (municipality) in the Province of Lecco in the Italian region Lombardy, located about  northeast of Milan and about  southwest of Lecco.

Dolzago borders the following municipalities: Barzago, Castello di Brianza, Colle Brianza, Ello, Oggiono, Sirone.

Demographic evolution

References

External links
 www.comune.dolzago.lecco.it/

Cities and towns in Lombardy